Nikephoros Diogenes, Latinized as Nicephorus Diogenes, was presumably a junior Byzantine emperor from 1070–1071. He was born in  1069 to Byzantine Emperor Romanos IV Diogenes and Empress Eudokia Makrembolitissa. He was elevated to junior emperor in 1070, although he lost this position when his father was overthrown in 1071. Emperor Alexios I Komnenos, after overthrowing Nikephoros III, made Nikephoros doux of Crete, and made him a general. Nikephoros conspired against him in 1094, involving numerous confidants and relatives of Alexios, including Alexios' brother, Adrianos. For this conspiracy, he was blinded, in accordance with Byzantine traditions. After this, he retired to his estates, and spent the last years of his life studying classical literature.

History
Nikephoros was born  1069 to Emperor Romanos IV Diogenes. Nikephoros was presumably elevated to junior emperor in 1070, despite being the second son. Although his half-brother Constantine Diogenes was the eldest son, he was borne of Romanos' unnamed first wife, who was the daughter of Alusian of Bulgaria, and therefore was excluded from the succession when Romanos married Eudokia Makrembolitissa. Nikephoros was removed as co-emperor in 1071, after the deposition of Romanos IV Diogenes by Michael VII. Michael VII ruled until 1078, when Nikephoros III Botaneiates overthrew him on 24 March. Nikephoros III was himself overthrown by Alexios I Komnenos in 1081. Alexios is said to have treated the sons of Diogenes, including Nikephoros, "as if they were his own". Nikephoros was made doux of Crete by Alexios I Komnenos sometime in the early 1090s, likely either 1089–1091 or 1092–1094. He was also probably granted significant estates in Crete at the same time as his appointment.

In June 1094 Nikephoros began to conspire against Alexios, seeking to kill him and install himself as emperor. Because he was a porphyrogenitos, being born to Romanos while he was still reigning, he had more legitimacy than Alexios, who was only related by blood to the throne through his uncle Isaac I Komnenos. Nikephoros was also described as having many positive characteristics, such as natural charm, magnetic personality, and good looks. In her Alexiad, Anna Komnene, the daughter of Alexios, describes him:

Nikephoros' revolt involved a huge number of Alexios' confidants and relatives, including former Empress Maria of Alania, Alexios' brother-in-law Michael Taronites, and indeed Alexios' full brother Adrianos Komnenos. The full list of names of conspirators is not known, but they are known to include leading members of the senate, army officers, and powerful aristocrats. Very few names are given by Anna Komnene, although it is considered likely this was more because the full extent was an embarrassment than her own lack of knowledge.

Nikephoros twice attempted to assassinate Alexios in person, however, the first time he was not able to do so because of the presence of a maid fanning mosquitoes off of the emperor, and the second time he was halted by a guard. Alexios became suspicious of Nikephoros, and ordered his brother Adrianos to investigate. Adrianos, who was already a member of the conspiracy, reported that he found nothing suspicious. Alexios, still suspicious, then arrested Nikephoros, and after being tortured, Nikephoros confessed the full extent of the conspiracy. Nikephoros was blinded in 1094 for conspiring against Alexios, which was a standard punishment for conspirators in Byzantine culture. The punishments inflicted upon the others conspirators are not fully known, however Alexios' brother Adrianos disappears from history after the conspiracy was discovered, and Michael Taronites was only spared by the intervention of his wife, Maria Komnene, who was the sister of Alexios.

After being blinded, Nikephoros retired to his estates, and spent the remaining years of his life studying classical literature, having secretaries read out the texts to him. After 1094, nothing more is heard of Nikephoros. In 1095 an impostor of Nikephoros, Pseudo-Diogenes, convinced the Cuman chieftains Boniak and Tugorkan to invade the Byzantine Empire, dethrone Alexios, install himself as emperor. The Cumans occupied Paristrion before being repulsed by Byzantine forces, led by Alexios.

References

Bibliography

Further reading

Nikephoros Diogenes' profile in the Prosopography of the Byzantine World.

Nikephoros
11th-century Byzantine people
Byzantine generals
Doukid dynasty
Nikephoros
Year of death unknown
Byzantine junior emperors
Generals of Alexios I Komnenos
1060s births
Sons of Byzantine emperors